Cristian Sleiker Cásseres Yepes Jr. (born 20 January 2000) is a Venezuelan professional footballer who plays as a midfielder for Major League Soccer club New York Red Bulls and the Venezuela national team.

Career

Early
Born in Caracas, Venezuela, Cásseres  began his career in the youth ranks of Atlético Venezuela playing as a striker. After leaving Atlético he joined the youth ranks of Deportivo La Guaira and was converted into a midfielder. On 27 September 2016, he scored four goals for the Under 20 side of Deportivo in a 4–2 victory over his former club Atlético Venezuela.

Deportivo La Guaira
On 9 October 2016, Cásseres Jr. made his professional debut for La Guaria at the age of 16 in a Venezuelan Primera División match against Atlético Venezuela, playing 33 minutes in the 3–3 draw. During the 2017 season, Cásseres became a fixture in the starting lineup for La Guaria due to his fine play. On 10 May 2017, Cásseres scored his first goal as a professional in a 3–1 victory over Zulia FC.

New York Red Bulls
On 2 February 2018, it was announced that Cásseres Jr. had signed with New York Red Bulls in Major League Soccer. Cásseres Jr. was loaned to affiliate side New York Red Bulls II during March 2018. On 17 March 2018, he made his first appearance for Red Bulls II, appearing as second half substitute in a 2–1 victory over Toronto FC II in the opening match of the season. On 9 June 2018, he scored his first goal for New York, scoring on a penalty kick to help his side to a 4–2 victory over Charlotte Independence.

On 29 August 2018, Cásseres Jr. made his first team debut, appearing as a starter for New York Red Bulls in a 1–0 victory over Houston Dynamo. On 6 April 2019, Cásseres Jr. scored his first goal for New York in a 2–1 loss to Minnesota United. On November 8, Cásseres Jr. was named the New York Red Bulls Defensive Player of the Year for 2019. For the next several years Cásseres Jr. became a fixture in the Red Bull midfield. On 17 October 2021, Cásseres Jr. scored the winning goal for Red Bulls in 1-0 victory in the Hudson River Derby over rival New York City FC. 

On 24 April 2022, Cásseres Jr. scored his first goal of the season for New York in a 3-0 victory over Orlando City SC.On 27 August 2022, Cásseres Jr. recorded two assists in a 3–1 victory against Inter Miami, and was named to the MLS Team of the Week for Week 27. On 31 August 2022, Cásseres Jr. assisted Lewis Morgan on the loan goal of the match in a 1-0 victory over CF Montréal, helping his club register its record ninth road win of the season.

International
Cásseres Jr. has featured regularly for his country’s U-17 team, playing at the 2017 South American Under-17 Football Championship.

In April 2017, Cásseres Jr. was called into training with the  Venezuela under-20 team in preparation for the 2017 FIFA U-20 World Cup.

He made his national team debut on 9 October 2020 in a World Cup qualifier game against Colombia.

Personal life
Cásseres was born into a football family: his father Cristian Cásseres represented the Venezuela national team 28 times, scoring two goals, and also played for Atlético Venezuela's first team while Cristian Jr. played for the U14 team.

Career statistics

Honours
New York Red Bulls
MLS Supporters' Shield: 2018

References

External links

 Profile on deportivolaguaira.com.ve

2000 births
Living people
Association football midfielders
Expatriate soccer players in the United States
Venezuelan Primera División players
Major League Soccer players
New York Red Bulls players
New York Red Bulls II players
Footballers from Caracas
Venezuela international footballers
Venezuela under-20 international footballers
Venezuela youth international footballers
Venezuelan expatriate sportspeople in the United States
Venezuelan footballers
USL Championship players
2021 Copa América players
21st-century Venezuelan people